Combinatorics, Probability and Computing is a peer-reviewed scientific journal in mathematics published by Cambridge University Press. Its editor-in-chief is Béla Bollobás (DPMMS and University of Memphis).

History 
The journal was established by Bollobás in 1992. Fields Medalist Timothy Gowers calls it "a personal favourite" among combinatorics journals and writes that it "maintains a high standard".

Content 
The journal covers combinatorics, probability theory, and theoretical computer science. Currently, it publishes six issues annually. As with other journals from the same publisher, it follows a hybrid green/gold open access policy, in which authors may either place copies of their papers in an institutional repository after a six-month embargo period, or pay an open access charge to make their papers free to read on the journal's website.

Abstracting and indexing
The journal is abstracted and indexed in:

According to the Journal Citation Reports, the journal has a 2014 impact factor of 0.623. Since 2007, it has been ranked by SCImago Journal Rank as a first-quartile journal in four areas: applied mathematics, computational theory, statistics and probability, and theoretical computer science.

References

External links
 

Combinatorics journals
Probability journals
Computer science journals
Cambridge University Press academic journals
Publications established in 1992
Bimonthly journals